{{DISPLAYTITLE:C27H46O2}}
The molecular formula C27H46O2 may refer to:

 Hydroxycholesterols
 7α-Hydroxycholesterol
 22R-Hydroxycholesterol(22(R)-Hydroxycholesterol)
 Cerebrosterol (24(S)-Hydroxycholesterol)
 25-Hydroxycholesterol
 27-Hydroxycholesterol
 Oxycholesterol
 δ-Tocopherol